Routenbeck is a hamlet in Cumbria, England. It is located at the northern foot of Sale Fell, near the north-west edge of Bassenthwaite Lake. Routenbeck is just over 2 miles south-west of the village of Bassenthwaite and 5 miles east of the town of Cockermouth. It contains an Old Vicarage. The nearest pub is the Pheasant Inn, about a third of a mile along the road to the north-east.

References

Hamlets in Cumbria
Allerdale